The Essex Senior Cup is a knock-out system football competition that has been running since 1884, and is the most prestigious cup competition in the county of Essex. The competition is run mainly for non-League clubs in the region, although league sides have been known to enter  the competition, such as Colchester United, Dagenham & Redbridge, Leyton Orient and Southend United. Ilford have won the competition the most times, with 13 wins (their first victory came in 1888 and their most recent in 1954). The current holders are Billericay Town, who beat Bowers & Pitsea 1–0 in the 2022 final at the Jobserve Community Stadium.

Finals
The following shows a full list of winners and runners-up in the Essex Senior Cup since the knock-out competition was started in 1883.

Key

Wins by club

Notes
 The 2005–06 final was not played due to Chelmsford City and Braintree Town being removed from the competition following the abandonment of their semi-final in the second half (63rd minute) due to an all-in-brawl. Waltham Forest beat Heybridge Swifts 3–0 in their semi-final.

References

External links
 Essex FA
 BBC Essex

Football in Essex
Recurring sporting events established in 1884
County Cup competitions
1884 establishments in England